The 12th Pan American Games were held in Mar del Plata, Argentina from March 11 to March 25, 1995.

Medals

Silver

Bronze

Women's Middleweight (– 70 kg): Ursula Guimet

See also
Peru at the 1996 Summer Olympics

Nations at the 1995 Pan American Games
Pan American Games
1995